The Greek Orthodox Metropolis of Boston (formerly the Greek Orthodox Diocese of Boston) is an ecclesiastical territory or metropolis of the Greek Orthodox Church in the New England region of the United States. It is led by a metropolitan bishop and is part of the Archdiocese of America which itself is under the control of the Ecumenical Patriarchate of Constantinople. On December 20, 2002, the territory was elevated from diocese to metropolis status, although its leader had been elevated to the role of metropolitan six years earlier in November 1997. The Annunciation Cathedral in the City of Boston serves as the head church, with metropolitan offices located in Brookline, Massachusetts alongside Hellenic College and Holy Cross. Metropolitan Methodios has led the territory since his enthronement as Bishop of Boston on April 8, 1984, following his election to that post by the Holy Synod of the Ecumenical Patriarchate in Phanar, Constantinople, Turkey.  In early October 2020 Metropolitan Methodios was suspended by the Holy Synod of the Ecumenical Patriarchate until Christmas for reasons undisclosed.

The Metropolis operates the St. Methodios Faith and Heritage Center in New Hampshire, which offers camping and spiritual retreats for families and individuals.

Bishops and Metropolitans of Boston
 1923–1930:     Bishop Ioakim (Alexopoulos) of Boston   
 1938–1949:     Bishop Athenagoras (Kavadas) of Boston 
 1950–1954:     Bishop Ezekiel (Tsoukalas) of Nazianzus
 1954–1960:     Bishop Athenagoras (Kokkinakis) of Elias 
 1961–1962:     Bishop Meletios (Tripodakis) of Christianoupolis 
 1962–1967:     Bishop Gerasimos (Papadopoulos) of Abydos 
 1968–1973:     Bishop Demetrios (Makris) of Olympus 
 1974–1978:     Bishop Iakovos (Garmatis) of Apameia 
 1979–1983:     Bishop Anthimos (Drakonakis) of Boston 
 1984–present:  Metropolitan Methodios (Tournas) of Boston

References

Eastern Orthodoxy in Massachusetts
Culture of Boston
Greek-American culture in Massachusetts
Religion in New England
Dioceses of the Greek Orthodox Archdiocese of America